Mississippi Highway 39 (MS 39) is a major south to north highway in the U.S. state of Mississippi. Spanning , it connects Meridian and NAS Meridian with DeKalb and Shuqualak.

Route description

MS 39 begins in Lauderdale County in the city of Meridian at the interchange between I-20/59, US 11/80, and MS 19 (Exit 154 A/B on I-20/59). It heads northwest through a business district as a four-lane undivided highway to cross Sowashee Creek and have an interchange with Russell Drive/B Street before making a sharp right onto Front Street (Original US 45). The highway now makes a sharp left turn at the southern end of unsigned MS 884 (OLD US 45) and heads north as a divided highway through neighborhoods and suburbs for several miles before leaving the city limits and entering the hilly woodlands of the North Central Hills. MS 39 passes through the community of Lizelia, where it has an intersection with MS 854 (John C Stennis Drive; provides access to the community of Meridian Station and Naval Air Station Meridian) and narrows to two-lanes, before passing through the community of Daleville and crossing into Kemper County.

MS 39 travels through hilly woodlands as it passes through the Blackwater community before entering De Kalb and traveling through neighborhoods as it joins Peach Avenue. The highway makes a sharp left onto Church Street for a block before making a sharp right onto Main Avenue and passing straight through downtown (and directly beside the Kemper County Courthouse). MS 39 leaves downtown and has a short concurrency with MS 16 before leaving De Kalb altogether and traveling through hilly remote woodlands for several miles, where it crosses the Sucarnoochee River before entering Noxubee County.

The terrain now flattens out as MS 39 becomes concurrent with MS 21 and enters the town of Shuqualak. MS 21/MS 39 pass straight through the center of town before having an intersection with MS 145, where MS 21 ends, before MS 39 comes to an end at an intersection with US 45.

Major intersections

References

External links

039
Transportation in Lauderdale County, Mississippi
Transportation in Kemper County, Mississippi
Transportation in Noxubee County, Mississippi